Martin Ester  (born November 5, 1958) is a Canadian-German Full Professor of Computing Science at Simon Fraser University. His research focuses on researcher data mining and machine learning.

Career
After earning his MS.c., Ester worked for Swissair before earning a position at the University of Munich as an Assistant Professor in 1993. Three years later, in 1996, Ester, Hans-Peter Kriegel, Jörg Sander and Xiaowei Xu proposed a data clustering algorithm called "Density-based spatial clustering of applications with noise" (DBSCAN). Their proposal won the 2014 KDD Test of Time Award for "outstanding papers from past KDD Conferences beyond the last decade that have had an important impact on the data mining research community."

A few years later, Ester moved to Vancouver and accepted a position at Simon Fraser University. In 2009, Ester was selected to become an Associate Editor of the IEEE Transactions on Knowledge and Data Engineering.

Between 2010 and 2015, Ester served as the SFU School of Computing Science director, before being succeeded by Greg Mori. In 2016, Arnetminer listed Ester as the world's most influential scholar in data mining. At the time, Arnetminer recorded that Ester authored 169 papers, which gained more than 21,000 citations, and hitting 50 on the h-index. Besides working as a Full Professor at SFU, Ester is also heading research at British Columbia Children's Hospital regarding genetic influence in drug reception and reactions in patients. His research team received a $9.9 million grant from Genome Canada for their research through Genome Canada's 2017 Large-Scale Applied Research Project Competition: Genomics and Precision Health.

As a result of his research, Ester was elected a Fellow of the Royal Society of Canada in 2019.

References

External links
Google scholar

Living people
1958 births
Fellows of the Royal Society of Canada
Canadian computer scientists
Computer scientists
Academic staff of Simon Fraser University
Academic staff of the Ludwig Maximilian University of Munich
Technical University of Dortmund alumni
ETH Zurich alumni